Back 2 Back Vol. 2 is a 2-disc DJ mix by German trance duo Cosmic Gate. Released in 2005, each disc in the volume included mixed songs by the likes of Marco V, Alex M.O.R.P.H and other DJs. It was released on Black Hole Recordings.

Style

Similar to there EP "Different Concept" from 2004, it featured songs that had Trance influences but were mostly marked as Hard Trance. The first disc leaned more on progressive trance and normal trance. The second disc had a few normal trance songs, but mostly had hard trance songs in it.

Track listing

Disc 1
 Cosmic Gate Feat. Jan Johnson - I Feel Wonderful (Cosmic Gate's From AM To PM Mix Edit) 
 Jonas Steur - Castamara
  Gott & Gordon - Midnight
  Lost Witness Feat. Tiff Lacey - Home (Mike Shiver Catching Sun Mix)
 Alex MORPH - New Harvest
 A Force Feat. Yahel - Behind Silence
 Acues & Elitist - Zonderland (8 Wonders Mirage At Dusk Mix)
 Pulser - Point Of Impact
 T4L - Perfect Blend 
 Purple Haze -  Adrenaline
 Hammer & Bennett - Language (Santiago Nino Dub Tech Mix)
 Cosmic Gate -   Race Car Driver (Back 2 Back Mix) 
 Surge - Morningside (Back 2 Back Mix) 
 Nic Chagall Pres. Encee - Sansibar
 Re-Locate - Absolum (Back 2 Back Edit)

Disc 2
 E-Craig - Call It A Day (2:12 PM Mix)
 Mark Norman - T-34
 Jochen Miller - India (Miller Dub)
 Cor Fijneman - Banger
 Marco V - More Than A Life Away (Original Mix)
 Mojado - Senorita (Mr. Sam Vision)
  DJ Ray, A.K.A. Joy-T-Suko - Electric (Original Mix) 
 Marc Marberg - Guarana
 Wippenberg - Earth
 Joop - Another World
 Marcel Woods - Cherry Blossom
 Frisky Warlock - Trespasser 
 Bardini Experience vs. Chris P. - The Movie (Progression Mix)
 Cosmic Gate - The Drums (Back 2 Back Mix) 
 64 Bit - Virtual Discotech 1.0 (Cosmic Gate Remix)

Cosmic Gate albums
2005 albums